Raltitrexed (Thaltitrexed, Tomudex, TDX, ZD 1694) is an antimetabolite drug used in cancer chemotherapy. It is an inhibitor of thymidylate synthase, and is manufactured by AstraZeneca.

Uses
Used in treatment of colorectal cancer since 1998, it may also be used in the treatment of malignant mesothelioma.  Raltitrexed is approved for use in Canada and some European countries, but is not approved by the US FDA.

Mechanism of action
Raltitrexed is chemically similar to folic acid and is in the class of chemotherapy drugs called folate antimetabolites,  which inhibit one or more of three enzymes that use folate and derivatives as substrates: DHFR, GARFT and thymidylate synthase. Raltitrexed is fully active after polyglutamylation, which allows cellular retention of the drug.

By inhibiting Thymidylate synthase (TS), thus formation of precursor pyrimidine nucleotides, raltitrexed prevents the formation of DNA and RNA, which are required for the growth and survival of both normal cells and cancer cells.

Inhibition of L1210 cell growth in culture IC50 = 9 nM, is one of the strongest antimetabolites in use.

Structure and phase I clinical trial of the precursor drug, CB3717, was  described in 1986.

References

 

Thiophenes
Mammalian dihydrofolate reductase inhibitors
Antifolates
AstraZeneca brands
Quinazolinones
Lactams
Thymidylate synthase inhibitors